Matilde Muñoz Gonzalves (born 3 September 1985) is a former Spanish tennis player.

On 21 August 2006, she reached her career-high singles ranking of world No. 272. On 7 August 2006, she peaked at No. 416 in the doubles rankings. She has won two singles titles on the ITF Women's Circuit.

Career
In February 2005, she first professional singles final at the $10k event in Mallorca she lost austrian Tina Schiechtl in the final.

In September 2005 she won her first professional singles title at the $25k event in Madrid beating Czech Olga Vymetálková in the final.

In April 2008, Muñoz Gonzalves won her second singles title in Torrent. She retired from tennis at the end of 2008.

ITF finals

Singles: 3 (2–1)

Doubles: 2 (0–2)

References

External links
 
 

1985 births
Living people
Spanish female tennis players
Sportspeople from Valencia
Tennis players from the Valencian Community